Metro Herald was the title of a free daily commuter newspaper in Dublin, Ireland. It was formed in 2010 following the merger of the two previously competing publications, Metro Ireland and Herald AM, to create a profit for their respective backers, including Independent News & Media, Daily Mail and General Trust, and The Irish Times.

The newspaper ceased publication on 19 December 2014. 13 jobs were lost. The company said that the newspaper had become "unsustainable".

References

2010 establishments in Ireland
2014 disestablishments in Ireland
Free daily newspapers
Mass media in Dublin (city)
Newspapers published in the Republic of Ireland
Publications established in 2010
Publications disestablished in 2014